Arthur Hobson Dean (October 16, 1898 – November 30, 1987) was a New York City lawyer and diplomat who was viewed as one of the leading corporate lawyers of his day, as well having served as a key advisor to numerous U.S. presidents.

Dean was chairman and senior partner of Sullivan & Cromwell, where he worked closely with John Foster Dulles.  He was the chief U.S. negotiator at Panmunjeom where he helped negotiate the Korean Armistice Agreement, which ended the Korean War, and also helped draft and negotiate the Nuclear Test Ban Treaty in 1963.  Dean was a member (and later served on the board of directors) of the Council on Foreign Relations, the Asia Society and served as a delegate to the United Nations. He was a member of the steering committee of the Bilderberg Group and participated in 14 conferences between 1957 and 1975.

An Ithaca, New York, native, Dean was educated at Ithaca High School and then Cornell University. After serving in the United States Navy during World War I, he received both a bachelor's and LL.B degree from Cornell, in 1921 and 1923, respectively, and was the managing editor of the Cornell Law Quarterly  Dean's official papers are maintained at Cornell University Library, of which he was a major patron.

References

1898 births
1987 deaths
New York (state) lawyers
Cornell Law School alumni
American diplomats
American people of the Korean War
Members of the Steering Committee of the Bilderberg Group
People from Ithaca, New York
Sullivan & Cromwell partners
20th-century American lawyers
United States Navy personnel of World War I
Ithaca High School (Ithaca, New York) alumni
Presidents of the American Society of International Law